Fabricio Bastos Pereira (born in Rio de Janeiro on September 19, 1981) is a Brazilian football player currently play for Persita Tangerang in the Indonesia Super League.

References

External links
Fabricio Bastos at Liga Indonesia

1981 births
Living people
Brazilian expatriate footballers
Brazilian expatriate sportspeople in Indonesia
Expatriate footballers in Indonesia
Liga 1 (Indonesia) players
Persema Malang players
PSMS Medan players
Persita Tangerang players
Association football midfielders
Footballers from Rio de Janeiro (city)
Brazilian footballers